Chiasson is a French surname which means 'of Chiasso' as it originated in the municipality of Chiasso on the Swiss/Italian border.

Notable people with the surname include:

 Dan Chiasson (born 1971), American poet and critic
 Herménégilde Chiasson (born 1946), Canadian playwright and poet
 John Nelson Chiasson (born 1952), American engineer
 Paul Chiasson, Canadian architect
 Scott Chiasson (born 1977), American baseball player
 Steve Chiasson (1967–1999), Canadian ice hockey player
 Warren Chiasson (born 1934), Canadian jazz vibraphonist
 Alex Chiasson (born 1990), Canadian ice hockey player
 Macy Chiasson (born 1991), American mixed martial artist